Nikolay or Nikolai Belov may refer to:

 Nikolay Belov (geochemist) (1891–1982), Soviet crystallographer and geochemist
 Nikolay Belov (general) (1896–1941), Red Army World War II major-general
 Nikolay Belov (wrestler) (1919–1987), Soviet wrestler
 Nikolai Belov (ice hockey) (born 1987), Russian ice hockey player